Pittsburgh Regional Transit's bus system covers Allegheny County, and its service extends into small portions of neighboring Beaver, Butler, and Westmoreland counties. These counties also have their own transit systems, including several routes that run into Downtown Pittsburgh, where riders can make connections with Pittsburgh Regional Transit service.

Route renumbering and realignments
From 1964 to 2010, the Port Authority used an alphanumeric numbering system.  With the renumbering and realignments outlined in the Transit Development Plan in 2009, the present numbering system was adopted in April 2010.

Light rail and busways are designated by the following colors:
  Red Line—former 42S South Hills Village via Beechview light rail route
  Blue Line—former 47S South Hills Village via Overbrook and 47L Library via Overbrook light rail routes
  Brown Line—former 52 Allentown light rail route (eliminated in 2011)
  Green—bus routes using the West Busway, designated with a 'G'
  Purple—bus routes using the Martin Luther King Jr. East Busway, designated with a 'P'
  Orange—bus routes using the I-279 HOV lane, designated with an 'O'
  Yellow—bus routes using the South Busway, designated with a 'Y'

As a result of the Transit Development Plan and a series of service cuts, many routes have been reworked or eliminated.

Bus routes

Bus operations
Route numbers operating seven days a week including holidays (4 am to 2 am daily) are listed in Blue. On most of the daily bus routes, they operate on a 60-minute interval after 7 pm Monday through Saturday and all day on Sunday and Holidays.
Route numbers operating Monday through Saturday with limited or no holiday hours (5 am to 10 pm weekdays; 7 am to 7 pm Saturdays) are listed in Red
Route numbers operating Monday through Friday only (5 am to 7 pm) are listed in Bold.
All other plain (non-bold) routes operate Monday through Friday during peak periods only (approx: 6 am to 9 am and 3 pm to 6 pm).

Local routes

Flyer routes

Eliminated services

Discontinued routes

Bus routes that are discontinued  from the lineup and integrated into other one or more route(s) throughout PAT's history include:

Former special services
Port Authority operated special park and ride shuttles to Steelers' games and other stadium events from 1967-2011.  Routes with an "S" were for servicing one time events.

See also
 List of streetcar routes in Pittsburgh

References

External links
Port Authority of Allegheny County website
Pittsburgh's transit history

Port Authority of Allegheny County
Transportation in Pittsburgh
 
Intermodal transportation authorities in Pennsylvania
Pittsburgh
Pennsylvania transportation-related lists
Transportation in Allegheny County, Pennsylvania